Folin may refer to :
 Otto Folin (1867–1934), a Swedish-born American chemist
 Folin's reagent, a reagent to detect level of amines in amino acids
 Haut-Folin, the highest point in the region of Burgundy on France
 Léopold de Folin (1817–1896), a French oceanographer
 a suffix found in natural phenol names (as in punicafolin or taxifolin) to specify the leaf origin of the substance

See also 
 Follin (disambiguation)